Labastide-Marnhac (Occitan: La Bastida de Marnhac) is a commune in the Lot department in the Occitania region in Southwestern France. In 2019, it had a population of 1,244.

See also
Communes of the Lot department

References

Labastidemarnhac